Aaron Novik (born July 21, 1974) is an American composer, clarinetist and bandleader based in San Francisco.  He is involved with the Bay Area Improv Scene and is a member of Edmund Welles The Bass Clarinet Quartet  which was a 2004 recipient of a New Works Creation and Presentation grant from Chamber Music America. Novik has appeared in San Francisco and New York City with guitarist Fred Frith re-creating his 1980 avant-garde dance album, Gravity.

Novik's most recent album Secrets of Secrets was released on John Zorn's Tzadik Records in February 2012 as part of the Radical Jewish Culture Series.  Secrets of Secrets was hailed by The East Bay Express as "enticing" and "ferociously executed"  and by The Jewish Week as "richly textured and eclectic avant-klez" for its use of the 13th century sacred Kabbalah texts of Rabbi Eleazar of Worms.  His second most recent album, Floating World Vol. 1 was released on the Porto Franco Record label in 2011. Albums The Samuel Suite, Simulacra and Kipple were released on the Evander label.

Discography
 Secrets of Secrets (Tzadik Records, 2012)
 Floating World Vol. 1 (Porto Franco Records, 2011)
 The Samuel Suite (Evander Records, 2008) 
 Simulacra (Evander Records, 2008)
 Kipple (Evander Records, 2006)
 Gubbish (Odd Shaped Case, 2004)

Digital Release Only
 Our Band Could Be as Serious as Your Life (2013)
 Love Triangle Elementary School (2013)
 Aaron Novik/Greg Saunier Duo (2013)
 Aaron Novik/Arrington de Dionyso Duo (2013)
 Frowny Frown Vol. 1 (2013)
 Storyboard Music Vol. 1 (2013)
 Storyboard Music Vol. 2 -featuring Edmund Welles (2013)

References

External links
 http://aaronnovik.com
 http://aaronnovik.bandcamp.com

American male composers
21st-century American composers
American clarinetists
Living people
1974 births
Musicians from San Francisco
21st-century clarinetists
21st-century American male musicians
Edmund Welles members